United States Navy ratings are general enlisted occupations used by the U.S. Navy since the 18th century, which denote the specific skills and abilities of the sailor. Each naval rating has its own specialty badge, which is worn on the left sleeve of dress uniforms of enlisted personnel.  U.S. naval ratings are the equivalent of military occupational specialty codes (MOS codes) used by the United States Army and the United States Marine Corps, the ratings system used by the United States Coast Guard, and Air Force Specialty Codes (AFSC) used by the United States Air Force and United States Space Force.

Ratings should not be confused with rates, which describe the Navy's enlisted rank and pay-grades.  Enlisted service members (sailors) are often referred to by a combination of both their rating and their pay-grade. For example, if a sailor has the pay-grade of E-5 (rank of petty officer second class) and the rating of boatswain's mate, then combining the two—boatswain's mate second class (BM2)—defines both rank and rating in formal address or epistolary salutation. Thus, boatswain's mate second class (BM2) would be that sailor's rate.

Sailors from pay-grades E-1 to E-3 have no rates and are considered to be in apprenticeships or training for a rating, thus the slang term "non-rates" when referring to them as a group.  They are instead divided into five general occupational fields (airman, constructionman, fireman, hospitalman, or seaman). A Sailor actively working toward a specific rating is referred to as  "striking for a rating" and is called a "striker".

Naval Officers: Although naval officers do specialize in various fields their occupations are classified according to designators for both officers of the line (e.g., line officers) and those of the professional staff corps.

History

The U.S. Navy's enlisted occupational system was a product of more than 200 years of Naval evolution. The Navy of the United Colonies of the 1775 era offered only a few different jobs above the level of ordinary seaman. These included Boatswain's mate, Quartermaster, and Gunner's Mate. These were titles of the jobs that individuals were actually performing and became the basis for petty officers and ratings. During this time, ship crews were taken from civilian life and enlisted for only one cruise, thus making the job at hand the primary consideration, rather than career possibilities. It was not until 1841 that distinguishing marks for a rating were prescribed in the Regulations of the Secretary of the Navy, but specialty marks were not added to enlisted men's uniforms until 1866. The marks consisted of the tools or instruments used in each rating's specific duty. The Master-at-Arms, the police officer of a ship, wore the star of authority and the Gunner's Mate wore two crossed cannons. Currently, all specialty marks for new ratings are approved by the Permanent Naval Uniform Board, which is a division of the Bureau of Naval Personnel.

As the U.S. Navy's rating system changed so did the U.S. Navy. The first steamship, mine, radar, torpedo, aircraft carrier, and many other "firsts" all established a new era in the Navy, and each directly impacted the enlisted occupation structure. During World War II, the U.S. Navy also briefly maintained a rating of "Specialist", similar to the rank in the U.S. Army. The rating of "Specialist" was discontinued in 1948.

Since the establishment of the rating system, the U.S. Navy enlisted rating structure played a key role in career development, serving as a basis for training, detailing, advancement, and simply keeping tabs on several hundred thousand sailors.

Temporary end of ratings
Beginning in June 2016, then Master Chief Petty Officer of the Navy, Michael D. Stevens, oversaw a review of the Navy's existing enlisted rating system. After Stevens's retirement, a group of senior enlisted leaders came to the conclusion that the Navy needed to replace its current enlisted system and announced the changes on 29 September 2016 with the release of NAVADMIN 218/16. The changes would have eliminated ratings in favor of the generic titles of "Seaman" (E-1 to E-3) or "Petty Officer" (E-4 to E-6) and accompanying Navy Occupational Specialty (NOS) codes. The Navy stated that the decision was motivated by a desire to assist former sailors in obtaining employment after their naval service by making naval job titles more congruent with their civilian counterparts, as well as to make said titles more unisex.

However, the "overwhelmingly unpopular decision" was not well received as many sailors had grown accustomed and attached to their ratings, viewing them as a source of morale. Further, they had no desire to be unisex. In response to widespread criticism, ratings were reinstated with immediate effect on 20 December 2016. Former CNO John Richardson indicated he still intended to change the personnel system in the future; however, he stepped down in 2019, and there has since been no change.

Rating structure

The pay grades E-4 (petty officer third class) through E-9 (master chief petty officer) fall within the rating structure. It is further broken down into four types of ratings and classifications:

 57 General ratings: consisting of broad occupational fields such as boatswain's mate, electronics technician, machinist's mate, fire controlman, etc.
 37 Service ratings: which are made up of sub categories of general ratings that require further specialized training and qualifications.  Service ratings are established, changed, or removed depending on service requirements and changes in the way personnel are managed.
 4 Compression ratings (AF, AV, CU, CB): Identify the combining of several general or service ratings at paygrade E-9 (E-8 for CU) to form broader career fields when the occupational content is similar. These ratings exist only at the E-8/E-9 levels and are not identified previously as a general or service rating.
 Navy Enlisted Classifications (NEC), which are alphanumeric codes attached to a specific rating and are frequently used to indicate specialized qualifications and Emergency ratings.
 Emergency ratings, which are specific ratings that can be established in time of war and are distinguished by a letter of the alphabet enclosed in a diamond.

Paygrades E-1 through E-3 can also have a rating abbreviation preceding their paygrade symbol if they are graduates of Class "A" schools; have received the rating designation in a previous enlistment; are assigned to a billet in that specialty as a striker; have passed an advancement examination and not been selected for advancement for reasons of numeric limitations on advancements; or have been reduced in rate because of punishment.  Examples: BMSR is a boatswain's mate seaman recruit (paygrade E-1); MMFA is a machinist's mate fireman apprentice (paygrade E-2); EOCN is an equipment operator constructionman (paygrade E-3).  HN is hospitalman, which is a hospital corpsman with the paygrade of E-3.

Aviation ratings

Aviation ratings notes 
I: ABE, ABF, and ABH combine at paygrade E-9 to the rate of Master Chief Aviation Boatswain's Mate (ABCM).
II: AM and AME combine at paygrade E-8 to the rate of Senior Chief Structural Mechanic (AMCS); AM, AME, and AD combine at paygrade E-9 to the rate of Master Chief Aircraft Maintenanceman (AFCM).
III: AE and AT combine at paygrade E-9 to the rate of Master Chief Avionics Technician (AVCM).
IV: In 2008, the AW rating merged with all other aircrew NEC's and changed their title from aviation warfare system operators to naval aircrewman.

Construction ratings

Construction ratings notes 
I: BU, EA, and SW combine, as follows:
at paygrade E-8 to the rating of Senior chief constructionman (CUCS)
before NAVADMIN 054/21; at paygrade E-9 to the rating of Master chief constructionman (CUCM).
II: Before NAVADMIN 054/21; CE and UT combine at paygrade E-9 to the rating of Master chief utilitiesman (UCCM).
III: Before NAVADMIN 054/21; CM and EO combine at paygrade E-9 to the rating of Master chief equipmentman (EQCM).

IV: Per NAVADMIN 054/21: Constructionman Master Chief (CUCM), Equipmentman Master Chief (EQCM) and Utilities Constructionman Master Chief (UCCM) [E-9 paygrades] rating names, all change to Seabee Master Chief (CBCM). The change applies to Active-Duty and Selected Reserve Sailors. Those Master Chiefs already in CUCM, EQCM or UCCM ratings were to be automatically converted to CBCM on 15 March 2021, but current source ratings badges were to be retained.

Medical rating

Administration, deck, technical, and weapons specialty ratings

Administration et cetera notes 
I: Cryptologic technician now includes former rating of electronic warfare technician (EW).
II: Information systems technician now includes former rating of cryptologic technician – communications (CTO).
III: Quartermaster QM now exists as electronics technician (navigation) ETV on submarines.
IIII: LN and RP are also issued to sailors attached to Marine units.

Engineering and hull ratings

Engineering and hull ratings notes 
Prior to March 2014, IC and EM combine at paygrade E-9 to the rating of Master Chief Electrician's Mate (EMCM). After that time, the IC Rating was moved to the Seaman ratings group from the Fireman ratings group. Now, upon selection to E9, ICCS is promoted to ICCM.

Command ratings

Discontinued and changed ratings (1962–present)

See also
 Air Force Specialty Code
 Badges of the United States Navy
 List of Naval Officer Designators
 List of United States Army careers 
 List of United States Coast Guard ratings
 List of United States Marine Corps MOS
 List of United States Navy enlisted warfare designations
 List of United States Navy staff corps (insignia)
 Navy Enlisted Classification
 Obsolete badges of the United States military
 Uniforms of the United States Navy
 United States Navy enlisted rate insignia
 United States Navy officer rank insignia

References
This article incorporates text in the public domain from the United States Navy.

External links
 NAVPERS 18068F Navy Enlisted Occupational Standards; also available as a PDF file
 Navy Specialist ratings

Ratings list
 
Military personnel